Tari (Hindi: तरी, Urdu: تاری) is a Kashmiri tribe and family name in the Kashmir region of India and Pakistan.

Ethnic groups in India
Social groups of Pakistan
Indian surnames
Surnames